The Native Building Workers Act, 1951 (Act No. 27 of 1951; subsequently renamed the Bantu Building Workers Act, 1951 and the Black Building Workers Act, 1951) formed part of the apartheid system of racial segregation in South Africa. It legalized the training of blacks in skilled labor in the construction industry, but limited the places in which they were permitted to work. Sections 15 and 19 made it an offense for blacks to work in the employ of whites performing skilled labor in their homes. It was repealed by section 11 of the Industrial Conciliation Amendment Act, Act No. 95 of 1980.

References

Apartheid laws in South Africa
1951 in South African law